The Skew Arch Bridge in Reading, Pennsylvania, also known as the Askew Bridge and nicknamed the Soap and Whiskey Bridge, is a historical skew arch bridge completed in 1857 carrying two tracks of the Philadelphia and Reading Railroad (P&R) at an angle over Sixth Street in Reading, Berks County, Pennsylvania. The bridge was acquired by Conrail after the P&R's demise in 1976, and was transferred to Norfolk Southern Railway in 1999.

History
The bridge was designed by Richard Osborne in 1856.  He submitted a model to the company made of pieces of soap before construction and workers were paid partially in whiskey, leading to the unusual nickname.

The main arch of the bridge spans , with two smaller arches spanning the sidewalks on either side.  The courses of the arch are constructed from local brownstone in elliptical curves which follow the angle at which the railroad tracks cross the street.  Because of this design, there is no keystone in the arch.

In 1951 the Pennsylvania Historical and Museum Commission placed a historical marker on the site, and in 1973 the bridge was listed on the National Register of Historic Places.

See also
List of bridges documented by the Historic American Engineering Record in Pennsylvania

References

Buildings and structures in Reading, Pennsylvania
Bridges completed in 1857
Railroad bridges on the National Register of Historic Places in Pennsylvania
Bridges in Berks County, Pennsylvania
Skew arch bridges
Historic American Engineering Record in Pennsylvania
Historic American Buildings Survey in Pennsylvania
1857 establishments in Pennsylvania
National Register of Historic Places in Reading, Pennsylvania
Stone arch bridges in the United States